This is a list of Wales international footballers born outside Wales. For the purposes of international football the football world governing body, FIFA, considers Scotland, England, Wales and Northern Ireland to be distinct and individual countries.

The following players were not born in Wales and have played at least one game for the senior Wales national football team. Players are listed by birthplace.


Belgium
 Pat Van Den Hauwe

Canada
 Leo Newton

Cyprus
 Jeremy Goss

England

 Harry Adams
 Ethan Ampadu
 Smart Arridge
 William Bell
 Ernie Bowdler
 Jack Bowdler
 Mark Bradley
 Tom Bradshaw
 Thomas Britten
 David Brooks
 Jason Brown
 Thomas Bryan
 Marcus Browning
 Thomas Burnett
 James Chester
 Simon Church
 Danny Collins
 Jack Collison
 John Cornforth
 Andrew Crofts
 Knyvett Crosse
 Mark Crossley
 Alan Davies
 Albert Davies
 Craig Davies
 John Davies
 Simon Davies
 Thomas Davies
 William Davies
 Andy Dorman
 Jack Doughty
 Roger Doughty
 Paul Dummett
 Freddy Eastwood
 David Edwards
 John Hawley Edwards
 Jim Edwards
 Robert Edwards
 Rob Edwards
 Ian Evans
 John Evans
 Paul Evans
 Robert Evans
 George Farmer
 Carl Fletcher
 Kieron Freeman
 Sam Gillam
 George Glascodine
 Richard Gough
 Gareth Hall
 Jack Hallam
 Dennis Heywood
 George Higham
 Mick Hill
 Trevor Hockey
 Glyn Hodges
 Frederick Hughes
 Alexander Hunter
 Lloyd Isgrove 
 Kenny Jackett
 Daniel James
 Andy Johnson
 Brennan Johnson
 David Jones
 Di Jones
 Richard Jones
 Ryan Jones
 Vinnie Jones
 Fred Kelly
 Andy King
 Alan Knill
 James Lawrence
 Benjamin Lewis
 Albert Lockley
 Robert McMillan
 Gavin Maguire
 Paul Mardon
 Rabbi Matondo
 Steve Morison
 Andy Marriott
 Chris Mepham
 Kieffer Moore
 Joe Morrell
 Charlie Morris
 Edward Morris
 James Morris
 John Morris
 Robert Morris
 Daniel Nardiello
 Lewin Nyatanga
 John Oster
 Digby Owen
 Thomas Owen
 Maurice Parry
 Tom Parry
 David Partridge
 Edward Phennah
 John Phillips
 Lewis Price
 Paul Price
 Sam Ricketts
 John Roach
 Dave Roberts
 Tyler Roberts
 Hal Robson-Kanu
 Henry Sabine
 George Savin
 Edward Shaw
 William Shone
 Matthew Smith
 Brian Stock
 Kit Symons
 Gareth Taylor
 Ben Thatcher
 George Thomas
 Sorba Thomas
 David Thomson
 George Thomson
 Alfred Townsend
 Paul Trollope
 Will Vaulks
 Sam Vokes
 Darren Ward
 Rhys Weston
 Ady Williams
 Andy Williams
 Ashley Williams
 George C Williams
 George H Williams
 Jonny Williams
 Joseph Williams
 Ben Woodburn

Germany
 Darren Barnard
 George Berry
 Adam Davies
 Alan Neilson
 David Phillips

Ireland
 William Harrison

Saudi Arabia
 Rhys Norrington-Davies

Scotland
 Daniel Grey
 Alexander Jones

Singapore
 Eric Young

Spain
 Josh Farrell

United States
 Adam Henley
 Boaz Myhill

Zambia
 Robert Earnshaw

Zimbabwe
 John Robinson

Notes

References
Places of birth sourced from 

Born
Wales
Association football player non-biographical articles
Welsh diaspora
Immigration to Wales
Wales